Richard Howard (1929−2022) was an American writer, literary critic, and translator.

Richard Howard may also refer to:
 Richard Howard, 4th Earl of Effingham (1748−1816), British peer and member of the House of Lords
 Richard Howard (actor) (born 1944), British actor
 Richard Howard (priest) (1884−1981), Anglican Provost of Coventry
 Richard A. Howard (1917−2003), American botanist
 Richard C. Howard, former mayor of Malden
 Richard Howard (NASCAR owner), former NASCAR race car owner
 Richard Watson Howard (1896−1918), World War I flying ace
 Richard P. Howard, historian emeritus of Community of Christ

See also 
 Dick Howard (disambiguation)